Antonino da Patti was a Sicilian priest. He suffered many persecutions, and died in Rome in 1617. He was buried at the church of San Francesco a Ripa.

Publications 
 Considerationi et espositioni sopra tutti li precetti della regola de' frati, Venice: Giovanni Guerigli, 1615.

References

Writers from Sicily
16th-century Italian Roman Catholic priests